State Highway 24 ( RJ SH 24) is a State Highway in Rajasthan state of India that connects Bhadoti Mod, Rajasthan with Bassi, Rajasthan. The total length of RJ SH 10 is 78.60 km.

References
 State Highway

Dausa district
Transport in Jaipur district
Sawai Madhopur district
Karauli district
State Highways in Rajasthan